Gaz Saleh-e Olya (also Romanized as Gaz Şāleḩ-e ‘Olyā; also known as Gaz Sala, Gaz Şāleḩ, Gaz Şāleḩ-e Bālā, Gesāleh, Gesāleh-ye Bālā, and Jezsāleh-ye ‘Olyā) is a village in Hoseynabad Rural District, Esmaili District, Anbarabad County, Kerman Province, Iran. At the 2006 census, its population was 687, in 148 families.

References 

Populated places in Anbarabad County